, also known as Retro Game Master in other regions, is a Japanese gaming-variety show television program produced by Fuji Television and Gascoin Company. The name is a combination of "game center" (the Japanese term for an arcade) and Fuji TV's call sign, JOCX-TV. It stars Shinya Arino, a member of comedy duo Yowiko, who plays home console video games from previous decades and usually attempts to get the game's ending within a single day. The show has been on-air since November 4, 2003, with a new episode airing bi-weekly at Thursday midnight on Fuji TV One. 18 DVD sets have been released in Japan. In 2008, Fuji TV was looking for international distributors for subtitled DVDs.

Premise
The show is presented as a gaming variety show which follows a commentary-based long-play format. Shinya Arino challenges several games from previous eras, presented by his producers in order to get each ending. He is supported by the show's assistant directors (referred to as ADs) and sometimes other staff, both via moral support and actual gameplay. He also is featured in segments interspersed throughout the episodes where he goes to local arcade centers, as well as segments where he does a variety of things, such as interviews with game designers, showcasing classic console hardware or games, or a made-up game show where the staff participates.

GameCenter CX as a company
Arino is presented as an employee of the fictitious GameCenter CX company. His jumpsuit attire is adorned with the GameCenter CX logo, which with the second season onward lost the original brackets around the "CX". Arino formally greets anyone of status by serving him/her a business card. The CX company even promotes Arino depending on how well he does during the season. The phrase Arino says right before turning on the console, "Kachō on!", signifies his role as chief of the aforementioned company.

To continue on with the corporate theme of the show, a stock certificate was included with the second DVD collection to have the buyers feel like they owned stock in the company. In the last episode of season 7, Bandai Namco Entertainment president Ishikawa made Arino an honorary employee and presented him with a company card.

ADs
The assistant directors help provide creative input, construct settings, and work as a camera crew at times, especially when on location. Their on-screen presence is typically precipitated by Arino struggling with a spot in a game. They will offer help of a varying degree, enough to dislodge Arino from his despair, but not so much as to raise questions about whether he beat the game on his own. These members of staff start as interns, and often they are promoted to various paid positions surrounding the show's production. Many have moved on to other Japanese TV shows. After they left the staff, sometimes they reappeared in next seasons or special DVD challenges.

  - Season 1
  - Seasons 1 & 2 (first episode only)
  - Season 2
  - Seasons 3 & 4
 , a.k.a.  - Seasons 5 & 6, become part of main staff since the end of season 13 as director
 , a.k.a.  - Season 7
  - Season 8
  - Seasons 9 & 10
 , a.k.a.  - Seasons 11 & 12
  - Seasons 11 & 12 & 13
 , a.k.a.  - Seasons 13 & 14 & 15
  - Seasons 13 & 14 & 15
  - Season 16
  - Seasons 16 & 17 & 18
  - Seasons 18 & 19 
  - Seasons 19 & 20
  - Seasons 20 & 21
  - Seasons 21 & 22
  - Seasons 22 & 23
  - Season 23
  - Season 23 & 24
  - Season 25

Miscellaneous staff
  - Cameraman
  - Art Director, Writer
  - Producer, Narrator
  - Video Editor
 , a.k.a.  - Voice Mixing
  - Planner
  - Assistant Director, left the staff in the 12th season. Came back as director in 17th season.
  - Assistant Director
  - Production
  - Assistant Director (AD)
  - Promotion (PR)

Music
 Audio clips from the videogame Kid Icarus (光神話 パルテナの鏡) are often used to intro segments with The King.
 The song used during Arino's arcade field trip adventures is called 異国のしらべ from HEAT WAVE.
 The song during his trip north is "Between the expansive sky and large land" by Chiharu Matsuyama.
 The second and third seasons made extensive use of the soundtracks from the games Headhunter and Headhunter Redemption to highlight the show's dramatic segments.
 The show also frequently features popular music by contemporary artists such as Phil Collins, Jesse McCartney and Madonna, as well as music from film scores like Jurassic Park and Disney's The Hunchback of Notre Dame.

Segment Songs 
 "Urawaza Jet Stream" uses the songs "The Intimacy of My Woman's Beautiful Eyes" by James Carter (for only one episode) and "Romeo Is Bleeding" by Tom Waits for the rest the segments. Episode 25 uses the song "Night Birds" by Shakatak while Arino is reading the postcard.
 "The Aces of Hardware Won't Disappear" uses (and is named after) the song "Heart No Ace ga Detekonai" by Candies.
 "The Romance Never Ends" uses (and is named after) the song "" by C-C-B.
 "Singing About Whatever the Hell You Want" uses (and is named after) the song "" by Kenji Sawada.
 "Retro Read-Aloud" uses the song Naturish by Marsh and Nox Vahn.
 "When I Looked Back, He Was There" uses the song "Yah Yah Yah" by Chage and Aska.
 "DJ Monster Battle" uses the song "Anasthasia" by T99.
 "Chief Arino's Bonus Assessment" uses the song "En Aranjuez con Tu Amor" by David Garrett.

 "KACHOxFAMILY" uses the song "Mixed Nuts" by Official Hige Dandism.

Game challenges

Main games
NOTE: An asterisk (*) is noted beside the episode number to indicate the episode's localization and release on Kotaku. Western titles in "quotes" are unofficial names Kotaku uses to refer to Japan-only games.

1st season
(This season featured a game series or game company as its main focus with Arino's challenge game as a secondary feature)

2nd season
(episode numbering started with Arino's challenge games being the main feature)

3rd season

4th season
(The season mascot changes from King to Queen)

5th season
(Season was shortened due to birth of Arino's daughter)

6th season
(The season mascot changes from Queen to Dark King)

7th season
(the season changes from Dark King to King. The Dark King makes a brief reappearance in #53)

8th season

9th season
(Season was shortened due to Arino being hospitalized)

10th season

11th season

12th season
(The season mascot changes from King to Fallen Warrior)

13th season
(The season mascot changes from Fallen Warrior to King)

14th season

15th season

16th season

17th season

18th season
(The season mascot changes from the King to Elephant King)

19th season

20th season

21st season
(During Episode 244, the staff switched to a CRT monitor during the light gun stages.)

22nd season

23rd season

24th season
(The season mascot changes from King to Frozen King and then to Penguin King.)

25th season
(The season mascot changes from Penguin King back to the King)

26th season

DVD-Exclusive Challenges
Each DVD-Box set released includes a game challenge exclusive to the DVD set. Most of these challenges were Famicom games.

Nintendo eShop-exclusive specials Challenges

Video releases
On June 23, 2011, gaming website Kotaku started streaming English translated episodes of the series. On January 13, 2012, Kotaku announced that their agreement to broadcast the show had ended; there would be no second season, and existing episodes would be removed when the rights expired. On February 28, 2012, Discotek Media announced that they had acquired the rights to the 12 episodes shown on Kotaku, releasing them on DVD on September 18, 2012.

So far there have been eighteen DVD sets put out with the latest released in December 2019. Each one contains key episodes, game center visits and a game challenge exclusive to the DVD set. They are not season compilations.

Segments
Each episode of GameCenter CX is made up of a number of different segments. The only segment which appears in every episode is Arino's Challenge. The other segments vary by episode and season. However, the episodes that appear on Kotaku omit these segments, instead of focusing only on the challenge of the week.

Media

Video games

At the end of the sixth season, it was announced that there were plans to make a GameCenter CX video game. The game, entitled GameCenter CX: Arino's Challenge, is for the Nintendo DS and was produced in a collaborative effort by Fuji TV and Bandai Namco Games. During the seventh season, certain parts of the show featured the development process of the game. The game was released in Japan on November 15, 2007, and in North America by Xseed Games on February 10, 2009, under the title Retro Game Challenge. A second game, GameCenter CX: Arino's Challenge 2 was released in Japan on February 26, 2009. Xseed Games has stated that US release of the game is unlikely, due to its predecessor's not catching enough attention from the North American gaming community. A third game, GameCenter CX: 3-Choume no Arino, was released in Japan on March 20, 2014, and is the first installment in the series to come to the Nintendo 3DS.

Arino appears as a Mystery Mushroom figure in Super Mario Maker, which is unlocked by clearing one of his Event Courses added to the game on November 4, 2015.

Theatrical Film
GameCenter CX: The Movie - 1986 Mighty Bomb Jack was released on February 22, 2014, to commemorate the 10th anniversary of the show.

Spin-Offs & Advertising
GameCenter DX starring another challenger (Masaru Hamaguchi, the other half of star Arino Kacho's comedy duo "Yoiko"), and featuring many staff of the original, began in 2015 to showcase contemporary Nintendo titles, such as the latest entries in the Mario Bros. and Starfox series.

Nintendo eShop-exclusive specials

On occasion, special GameCenter CX programs were produced for the Nintendo Channel for the Wii.

Later, when the Nintendo eShop succeeded the Nintendo Channel, additional specials were produced, such as a special where Arino and late Nintendo president Satoru Iwata interviewed each other and played Balloon Fight, which Iwata had programmed during the early years of his career.

References

External links
 Official GameCenter CX site (Japanese)
 English episode guide at Crunk Games

2003 Japanese television series debuts
Television shows about video games
Fictional companies
Discotek Media
Fuji TV original programming